Destination Games was an American computer game development company created in April 2000 by Richard Garriott, Robert Garriott and Starr Long, following their departure from Origin Systems. ("Destination" is a play on "Origin", the company the Garriotts founded nearly two decades earlier.)

Destination was founded in Austin, Texas to develop massively multiplayer online role-playing games. At E3 2001, Richard Garriott announced a partnership making Destination the United States headquarters of South Korean MMORPG giant NCSOFT. As NCSOFT Austin, Destination has mainly focused on developing and supporting the North American version of NCSOFT's Lineage games.

In 2007 Destination Games released its first game, Tabula Rasa, a sci-fi MMORPG. The game did not sell as well as was hoped, Richard Garriott left NCSOFT in 2008, and the game service closed in February 2009.  The Destination Games website was taken down when NCsoft moved its United States headquarters from Austin to Seattle—calling it NCSOFT West—in 2008.

NCSOFT Austin employed five people to run the casual MMOG Dungeon Runners, but announced in 2009 that support for this game will be ending in early 2010 due to low subscription numbers. As of October 2009, NCSOFT employs about 150 people in the former Destination Games office in Austin mainly working in server operations, quality assurance, and customer support for various NCSOFT MMO titles, however development operations have moved completely to other NCSSOFT subsidiaries on the West Coast.  The trademark Destination Games remains a property of NCSOFT.

References

External links
Destination Games
Forwards to PlayNC US or PlayNC Europe depending on location detected.
Original homepage prior to forwarding to NCSOFT websites can be found at this Internet Archive link: Destination Games, Inc.

NCSoft
Defunct video game companies of the United States
Video game development companies
Video game companies established in 2000
Video game companies disestablished in 2009
Companies based in Austin, Texas
Video game companies based in Texas
Defunct companies based in Texas
2000 establishments in Texas
2009 disestablishments in Texas